Rolland Ezuruike (born 5 May 1976) is a Nigerian powerlifter. He competed in the men's 72 kg event at the 2014 Commonwealth Games where he won a silver medal. On 9 September 2016, he set a new paralympics record in the men's – 54kg category after lifting 200kg at the 2016 Summer Paralympics in Rio de Janeiro, Brazil. He also competed in the men's – 54kg category at the 2015 African Games, where he also won gold. Ezuruike improved his previous Commonwealth performance by winning gold in the men's lightweight powerlifting at the 2018 Commonwealth Games on the Gold Coast, Australia.

References

1976 births
African Games gold medalists for Nigeria
African Games medalists in weightlifting
Commonwealth Games gold medallists for Nigeria
Commonwealth Games medallists in powerlifting
Commonwealth Games silver medallists for Nigeria
Living people
Medalists at the 2016 Summer Paralympics
Nigerian male weightlifters
Powerlifters at the 2014 Commonwealth Games
Powerlifters at the 2018 Commonwealth Games
Competitors at the 2015 African Games
Paralympic medalists in powerlifting
Paralympic gold medalists for Nigeria
Powerlifters at the 2016 Summer Paralympics
Paralympic powerlifters of Nigeria
Nigerian powerlifters
Sportspeople from Imo State
20th-century Nigerian people
21st-century Nigerian people
Medallists at the 2014 Commonwealth Games
Medallists at the 2018 Commonwealth Games